The Switzerland national football team represents Switzerland in international football. The national team is controlled by the Swiss Football Association.

Switzerland's best performances at the FIFA World Cup were three quarter-final appearances, in 1934, 1938 and 1954. They hosted the competition in 1954, where they played against Austria in the quarter-final match, losing 7–5, which today still stands as the highest scoring World Cup match ever. At the 2006 FIFA World Cup, Switzerland set a FIFA World Cup record by being eliminated from the tournament despite not conceding a single goal, being eliminated by Ukraine after penalties in the round of sixteen. They did not concede a goal until a match against Chile at the 2010 FIFA World Cup, conceding in the 75th minute, setting a World Cup finals record for consecutive minutes without conceding a goal.

Switzerland and Austria were the co-hosts of UEFA Euro 2008, where the Swiss made their third appearance in the competition, but failed for a third time to progress from the group stage. However, since then, the Swiss made it to the Round of 16 during UEFA Euro 2016, and achieved a record-best quarter-final showing at UEFA Euro 2020.

Overall, Switzerland's best ever result at an official football competition was the silver medal they earned in 1924, after losing to Uruguay 3–0 in the final of the 1924 Olympic Games.

History

1924–1966: Early years, host nation 

At the 1924 Paris Olympic Games, Switzerland finished with a silver medal after losing to Uruguay in the final, losing 3–0. The team's debut appearance at the World Cup was in 1934, where they reached the quarter-finals after beating the Netherlands 3–2 in the round of sixteen before getting knocked out by Czechoslovakia. Switzerland once again reached the quarter-finals in 1938; after beating Germany in the round of sixteen, winning 4–2 after a replay but were knocked out by Hungary, losing 2–0. At the 1950 World Cup, Switzerland were drawn in a group with Brazil, Yugoslavia and Mexico, where they lost 4–0 to Yugoslavia in the opening match, drew 2–2 with Brazil in their second match and beating Mexico 2–1 in their final group mach, and finished third in their group. On 22 July 1946, Switzerland was awarded the right to host the 1954 FIFA World Cup unopposed, in Luxembourg City. At the World Cup, Switzerland finished second in their group behind England; beating Italy and losing to England, but qualified for the quarter-finals after beating Italy in a group play-off. They were knocked out of the tournament after losing 7–5 to Austria. At the 1962 World Cup, Switzerland finished bottom of the group, losing all three games, losing 3–1 to Chile, 2–1 to West Germany and 3–0 to Italy. A similar result occurred at the 1966 World Cup, where Switzerland again finished at the bottom of their group losing all three of their matches, 5–0 to West Germany, 2–1 to Spain and 2–0 to Argentina.

1992–1996: the Roy Hodgson era 
In 1992, Switzerland appointed English manager Roy Hodgson as head coach of the national team; and at the time of his appointment, the Swiss had not qualified for any major tournament since 1966. Under his guidance, Switzerland rose to 3rd in the FIFA World Ranking in August 1993, which still remains their highest FIFA ranking to this day. Hodgson led Switzerland to the 1994 FIFA World Cup, losing just one game during qualifying, in a group that included Italy, and much fancied Portugal, and Scotland. The Swiss won their home tie with Italy, and in the away game, took a 2–0 lead before being pegged back to a 2–2 draw, and also took four points from Scotland, winning 3–1 at home and drawing 1–1 away. Against the Portuguese, Switzerland drew 1–1 at home and lost 1–0 in the away fixture in Porto, their only defeat of the qualifying campaign. Their opening match against the United States, on 18 June 1994, was played indoors; in the Pontiac Silverdome, and the two teams drew 1–1 in the opening match of the 1994 FIFA World Cup. In the next match, they won 4–1 over Romania, and in their final game against Colombia, lost 2–0. Nevertheless, Switzerland still qualified from the group, but were knocked out by Spain, losing 3–0.

2000–2008: the Köbi Kuhn era 
At UEFA Euro 1996, Switzerland once again easily qualified for the tournament finals hosted in England, as they topped their qualifying group, losing just once; which was a 1–2 defeat to Turkey. They were drawn in Group A, but their tournament was disappointing overall; as they finished bottom of the group. Their opening match was against hosts England, and the two sides drew 1–1. In their second match, they lost 2–0 to the Netherlands, and in their final group game, lost 1–0 to Scotland. Switzerland failed to qualify for the 1998 FIFA World Cup, hosted in France, as they finished fourth in their qualifying group, winning three games; 3–2 against Finland, 1–0 against Hungary and 5–0 against Azerbaijan, drawing one game against Hungary (1–1), and losing three games; 1–0 against Azerbaijan and losing both games against Norway, losing 1–0 at home and 5–0 away.   

In qualifying for UEFA Euro 2004, Switzerland finished top of a group that featured Russia, the Republic of Ireland, Albania and Georgia. The Swiss finished with 21 points and qualified for the finals in Portugal; where they were drawn in Group B with defending champions France, England and Croatia. They began the tournament with 0–0 draw with Croatia before succumbing to a 3–0 defeat to England in the next match. They lost their final match against France; losing 3–1 and finishing bottom of the group. Their only goal of the entire tournament was scored by Johan Vonlanthen, who became the youngest ever goalscorer at the Euros when he scored the equalizing goal against France; surpassing the previous record set only four days earlier by Wayne Rooney by three months.

The Swiss managed to qualify for the 2006 FIFA World Cup, overcoming Turkey by away goal rule in Istanbul, the country's first World Cup since 1994. In the tournament, Switzerland was drawn in Group G with former world champions France, 2002 World Cup's fourth-place finisher South Korea and debutant Togo. In the first encounter against France, Switzerland bravely held the mighty France of Zinedine Zidane 0–0, before overcoming the Togolese 2–0 in the second match, tied with the South Koreans four points, however the Swiss were inferior to the Koreans by number of goal scored, meaning that the last game a must-win. The Swiss then managed to beat South Korea 2–0 in the final match, occupying the first place in their group and also knocking the Asians out of the tournament. In the round of sixteen, Switzerland faced Ukraine, but lost on penalty shootout in a match that has been criticized as the "worst game" in World Cup history. Yet, Switzerland was the only team to be eliminated without conceding a single goal.

Switzerland, along with Austria, were chosen as co-hosts of UEFA Euro 2008. Switzerland were drawn in Group A with Portugal, Turkey and the Czech Republic. Their opening match was a 1–0 loss to the Czech Republic, followed by a 1–2 defeat to Turkey. Their third match was against Portugal, with Switzerland winning 2–0 to ensure that Portugal would top their group with a defeat.

2008–2014: the Ottmar Hitzfeld era 
In their first match at the 2010 FIFA World Cup, the team defeated eventual champions Spain 1–0 with a goal by Gelson Fernandes, but they were still eliminated in the group stage. In the second match, a goal scored by Mark González in the 75th minute of the game against Chile ended a 559-minute streak without conceding a goal in World Cup matches, beating the record previously held by Italy by nine minutes. Switzerland did not advance further than the group after a 0–0 draw with Honduras in the third and final group match.

Switzerland did not qualify for UEFA Euro 2012; missing out on the tournament for the first time in a decade, as they finished third in the qualifying group, a group featuring England, Montenegro, Wales and Bulgaria. Switzerland's initial start in qualifying was overall poor; losing 1–3 to England in the first game played, in which Xherdan Shaqiri scored his first goal for the national team, followed by a 1–0 defeat to Montenegro. Switzerland then recorded a 4–1 win over Wales before consecutive draws against Bulgaria (0–0) and England (2–2). Switzerland's hopes of qualifying were restored with a 3–1 win over Bulgaria, with a hat-trick from Xherdan Shaqiri. However, following a 2–0 loss to Wales (in which Reto Ziegler earned a red card) and Montenegro's surprising last-minute equalizer against England in a 2–2 draw, Switzerland's hopes of qualifying were mathematically made impossible. In the final game, Switzerland earned redemption against Montenegro as they came out with a 2–0 win. Switzerland's top goalscorer during the qualifying period was Xherdan Shaqiri, with 4 goals.

At the 2014 FIFA World Cup in Brazil, Switzerland were drawn to play France, Honduras and Ecuador in the group stage. They advanced to the round of sixteen with a 3–0 win over Honduras, with a hat-trick from Xherdan Shaqiri. In the knockout match against Argentina, they lost 1–0, conceding to Ángel Di María in the 118th minute.

2016–2021: the Vladimir Petković era 
At Euro 2016, Switzerland were selected to play in Group A of the tournament; alongside hosts France, Albania and Romania. In the first game, Switzerland won 1–0 over Albania, with the only goal being scored by Fabian Schär in the 5th minute of the game. The next match was a 1–1 draw with Romania, with Switzerland initially conceding from a penalty but equalizing in the second half following a goal from Admir Mehmedi. The final group game was against France, drawing 0–0. However, the game spread notoriety for several Swiss players' jerseys being ripped during challenges with the French players, and also for the ball bursting during a challenge between Antoine Griezmann and Valon Behrami when they both converged on the ball, with the game also attracting attention for its poor surface, which was criticized by both coaches and players of the two teams; after the game, Switzerland's kit manufacturer had blamed "faulty material" for the incidents regarding the jerseys being ripped. Switzerland, due to the draw, finished second in the group to set up a tie against Poland in the round of sixteen; initially the Swiss conceded but managed to find a late equalizer from Xherdan Shaqiri, who scored a bicycle-kick to send the game into extra-time, but the Swiss were knocked out as Granit Xhaka had missed the second penalty during the penalty shootout, as all other players managed to convert their penalties, with Poland winning 5–4 on penalties to go through and knock out the Swiss.
In qualifying for the 2018 FIFA World Cup, Switzerland were drawn with Portugal, Hungary, Faroe Islands, Latvia and Andorra. The Swiss began their qualifying group with a shock 2–0 win over European champions Portugal, who had won the tournament less than two months prior to playing with them on 6 September. Afterwards, they beat Hungary 2–3, Andorra 2–1, Faroe Islands 2–0, Latvia 1–0 in the first five games, leading the group on maximum points. In the reverse fixtures, they beat Faroe Islands 2–0, Andorra 3–0, Latvia 3–0 and Hungary 5–2, before facing Portugal in the final group game, where they lost 2–0, meaning they would have to play in the play-offs; where they were ranked as the best second-placed team, and were drawn to play Northern Ireland. In the first leg, played on 9 November, they won 1–0 through a controversial penalty scored by Ricardo Rodríguez, and three days later played in the second leg, drawing 0–0 and advancing to the World Cup finals in Russia with a 1–0 aggregate win. Before the World Cup, Switzerland were ranked 6th in the world ranking, even ranking higher than eventual World Cup winners France.

At the World Cup, Switzerland were drawn to play Brazil, Serbia and Costa Rica in Group E. They began their campaign with a 1–1 draw with Brazil, before beating Serbia 2–1 through a late winning goal from Xherdan Shaqiri. The game with Serbia sparked controversy for the celebrations performed by goalscorers Xherdan Shaqiri and Granit Xhaka (both ethnic Albanians), along with Stephan Lichtsteiner as the trio performed a celebration where they crossed their hands to depict a double-headed eagle, the official emblem of Albania, considered by many as an Albanian nationalist symbol, however, they were not banned by FIFA for this. Their final group game was with Costa Rica; which they drew 2–2, with Blerim Džemaili and Josip Drmić scoring; thus finishing second in the group. They were drawn to play Sweden in the round of sixteen; a fixture they lost 1–0, getting knocked out of the tournament.

On 23 January 2018, Switzerland were selected to play in the inaugural edition of the UEFA Nations League; a tournament contested by all UEFA member's national teams, being drawn to play in League A, in Group 2, against Belgium and Iceland.

At Euro 2020, Switzerland finished third in Group A which had Italy, Wales and Turkey; however, they managed to qualify to the next round as one of the best third-placed teams. In the round of 16, they defeated World Cup champions France on penalties, after finishing a 3–3 draw and overcoming from a 1–3 second half deficit, to have their first knockout phase win in a major tournament since the 1938 FIFA World Cup. In the subsequent quarter-final game against Spain, they once again took the game to penalties, after trailing 1–0. However, after converting only one of their four penalties, they exited the tournament at this stage.

2021–present: the Murat Yakin era 
On 9 August 2021, Yakin became the manager of the Swiss national team. During the 2022 World Cup qualification, Switzerland finished in the first place ahead of Italy in Group C, which granted them a spot in the 2022 FIFA World Cup in Qatar. During the World Cup, Switzerland finished second in Group G to qualify the round of 16, where they lost 6–1 to Portugal.

Team image

Kit 

The Switzerland national team's traditional home kit is red shirts, white shorts and red socks, with the away kit being reverse with white shirts, red shorts and white socks, although the colours of the shorts and socks are interchangeable if there is a minor clash. Switzerland, ever since being established in 1895, have always had the same colour code, as tradition and homage to the national colours which are derived from the Swiss flag. The current kit manufacturer is Puma, who have made their kits since 1998.

Kit sponsorship

Results and fixtures

The following is a list of match results in the last 12 months, as well as any future matches that have been scheduled.

2022

2023

Coaching staff

Coaching history

Players

Current squad
The following squad was named for the UEFA Euro 2024 qualifying games against Belarus and Israel on 25 and 28 March 2023.

Caps and goals updated as of 6 December 2022, after the match against Portugal.

Recent call-ups
The following players have been called up for the team in the last twelve months and are still available for a call up.

 INJ

 INJ

 INJ

 INJ
 INJ

 INJ

COV Player withdrew from the squad due to testing positive for COVID-19.
INJ Player withdrew from the squad due to an injury or illness.
PRE Preliminary squad.
RET Retired from international football.
SUS Serving suspension

Player records
 
Players in bold are still active with Switzerland.

Most appearances

Top goalscorers

Competitive record
Switzerland has yet to win a major international trophy, and the best result they have achieved thus far is the quarter-finals of the World Cup on three occasions, in 1934, 1938 and 1954, also reaching the same stage at Euro 2020. They earned a silver medal at the 1924 Olympic Games, held in Paris, where they lost 3–0 to Uruguay in the final. The Swiss youth teams have been more successful; as the U-17 squad won the 2002 UEFA U-17 Euro and the 2009 FIFA U-17 World Cup, while the U-21 squad qualified for the semi-finals of the 2002 UEFA U-21 Euro, and were finalists of the 2011 UEFA U-21 Euro.

FIFA World Cup

*Draws include knockout matches decided via penalty shoot-out.
**Red border colour indicates that the tournament was held on home soil.

UEFA European Championship

*Draws include knockout matches decided via penalty shoot-out.
**Red border colour indicates that the tournament was held on home soil.

UEFA Nations League

*Draws include knockout matches decided via penalty shoot-out.

Olympic Games

Head-to-head record

See also 

 List of Switzerland international footballers
 Switzerland national under-23 football team (Switzerland Olympic team)
 Switzerland national under-21 football team
 Switzerland national under-20 football team
 Switzerland national under-19 football team
 Switzerland national under-18 football team
 Switzerland national under-17 football team
 Switzerland national under-16 football team
 Swiss Footballer of the Year

References

External links 

 Official website 
 FIFA profile
 UEFA profile
 RSSSF archive of results 1905–
 RSSSF archive of coaches 1905–

 
European national association football teams
Football in Switzerland